Graben is a municipality in the Oberaargau administrative district in the canton of Bern in Switzerland.

History
Graben is first mentioned in 1220 as Stadonce.  In the 19th Century it was known as Graben durch den Wald.

Geography
 
Of this area,  or 52.8% is used for agricultural purposes, while  or 36.7% is forested.

Of the built up area, housing and buildings made up 4.7% and transportation infrastructure made up 1.9%.  33.9% of the total land area is heavily forested and 2.8% is covered with orchards or small clusters of trees.  Of the agricultural land, 36.4% is used for growing crops and 16.1% is pastures.  All the water in the municipality is in rivers and streams.

The municipality is located at the confluence of the Önz into the Aare river a nature reserve.  It includes the hamlets of Baumgarten, Burach, Gsoll, Hubel, Kleinholz, Schörlishäusern, Schwendi and Stadönz.

Demographics
, 4.7% of the population was made up of foreign nationals. Over the last 10 years the population has grown at a rate of 0.3%. Most of the population speaks German  (98.7%), with French being second most common ( 1.0%) and English being third ( 0.3%).

In the 2007 election the most popular party was the SVP which received 62% of the vote.  The next three most popular parties were the SPS (9.7%), the local small left-wing parties (8.3%) and the FDP (8%).

The age distribution of the population is children and teenagers (0–19 years old) make up 27.2% of the population, while adults (20–64 years old) make up 56% and seniors (over 64 years old) make up 16.8%.  About 75.9% of the population (between age 25-64) have completed either non-mandatory upper secondary education or additional higher education (either university or a Fachhochschule).  

Graben has an unemployment rate of 1.97%.  , there were 39 people employed in the primary economic sector and about 12 businesses involved in this sector.  6 people are employed in the secondary sector and there are 2 businesses in this sector.  45 people are employed in the tertiary sector, with 6 businesses in this sector.
The historical population is given in the following table:

References

External links

 

Municipalities of the canton of Bern